Kamienowola  is a village in the administrative district of Gmina Ostrówek, within Lubartów County, Lublin Voivodeship, in eastern Poland.

The village has a population of 284.

References

Kamienowola